Roughhouse was an American glam metal band founded as Teeze in 1983. Their name was changed to Roughhouse in 1988. Max Norman produced the debut album. In 1989, the band broke up and reunited for some shows in 1992, 1993, 2002, 2016, 2017, and 2019. The members of the band are vocalist Luis Rivera, guitarist Tripp Eisen and Gregg Malack, bassist Dave Weakley, and drummer Mike Natalini.

On October 15, 2016, Roughhouse performed their first show in 14 years at the Whiskey Tango in Philadelphia. This was followed with more shows in 2017.

Members

Teeze

1983–1986 
 Luis Rivera (lead vocals)
 Gregg Malack (guitar, vocals)
 Dave Weakley (bass, lead vocals)
 Brian Stover (guitar, vocals)
 Kevin Stover (drums, vocals)

1986–1988 
 Luis Rivera (lead vocals)
 Gregg Malack (guitar, vocals)
 Dave Weakley (bass, lead vocals)
 Tripp Eisen (guitar, vocals) – credited as Rex Eisen
 Mike Natalini (drums, vocals)

Roughhouse

1988–1989 
 Luis Rivera (lead vocals)
 Gregg Malack (guitar, vocals)
 Dave Weakley (bass, lead vocals)
 Tripp Eisen (guitar, vocals) – credited as Rex Eisen
 Mike Natalini (drums, vocals)

Discography 
 Teeze (1984, SMC Records)
 Teeze (1985, Greenworld Records)
 Roughhouse (1988, CBS Records International)

References 

Heavy metal musical groups from Pennsylvania